Marco Álvarez Gutierrez (born November 5, 1972) is a Spanish musician. He is the drummer for heavy metal group The Black Horde and folk metal band Taranus.

Career 
Born in Gijon, when he was almost 14 years old discovered his passion for heavy metal. He has also been the drummer for Stormy Mondays and Heavy metal/progressive metal band called Avalanch along with Alberto Rionda until the band hiatus in 2012.

Discography

Avalanch 
Los Poetas Han Muerto (2003)El Hijo Pródigo (2005)Muerte Y Vida (2007)El Ladrón De Sueños (2010)Malefic Time: Apocalypse (2011)

DVD
"Cien Veces" (2005)
"Lágrimas Negras" (2006)

Compilations & re-recorded albumsMother Earth (2004) (English version of Los Poetas Han Muerto)Las Ruinas del Edén (2004) - Re-recorded songs.Un Paso Más (2005) - Greatest hits.

TaranusTaranus (2012)

References

1972 births
Living people
Spanish drummers
Avalanch members
21st-century drummers